Martinsburg is an extinct town in Ripley County, in the U.S. state of Missouri.
 
A post office called Martinsburgh was established in 1842, and remained in operation until 1867. The community was named after John F. Martin, a local merchant.

References

Ghost towns in Missouri
Former populated places in Ripley County, Missouri